Taxila Cantonment is a cantonment adjacent to Taxila in Rawalpindi District, Punjab province, Pakistan. The city is home to Heavy Industries Taxila — a major defence, engineering conglomerate, and military corporation. Taxila Cantonment is also home to the HITEC University.

Location
Taxila Cantonment is located immediately east of Taxila city, and is surrounded by the villages of Shahpur, Dhok Wajjan, and Karamwal. It is also bordered by Taxila's neighbourhoods of Muslim Colony and Hassan Colony. The cantonment is 41 kilometres away from Islamabad by road.

Administration 
Taxila Cantonment is managed by the Taxila Cantonment Board under the control of the Military Lands & Cantonments Department (ML&C), Ministry of Defence. Cantonments throughout Pakistan are established under and governed by the Cantonments Act 1924.

Transportation

Rail
Taxila Cantonment is the location of Taxila's railway station, the Taxila Cantonment Junction railway station, also known as Taxila Junction. Taxila Junction is served by the Karachi–Peshawar Railway Line, and is the southern terminus of the Khunjerab Railway, which connects Taxila to the Havelian railway station. A planned extension of the railway will eventually connect Taxila to China's Southern Xinjiang Railway in Kashgar, as part of the China–Pakistan Economic Corridor.

Road

Taxila junction's road network merges into that of the Taxila city. The ancient Grand Trunk Road is designated as N-5 National Highway, and connects the city to the Afghan border, and northern Punjab. The Karakoram Highway's southern terminus is in nearby Hasan Abdal, and connects Taxila to the Chinese border near the Hunza Valley.

Motorways 
The city is linked to Peshawar and Islamabad by the M-1 Motorway, which in turn offers wider motorway access to Lahore via the M-2 Motorway, and Faisalabad via the M-4 Motorway.

Air 
The nearest airport to Taxila Cantonment is Islamabad International Airport, located 35 kilometres away by road. Peshawar's Bacha Khan International Airport is 155 kilometres away by road.

References

Cantonments of Pakistan